Driver (Dvr) was a military rank used in the British Army and the armies of other Commonwealth countries. It was equivalent to the rank of private.

The rank was initially used in the Royal Artillery for the men who drove the teams of horses which pulled the guns. It was phased out after the First World War (when all Royal Artillerymen of the lowest rank were redesignated as gunners). It was also used in the Royal Australian Artillery and Royal Canadian Artillery.

It was also used by all the private-equivalents of the Royal Army Service Corps and later the Royal Corps of Transport, no matter what their trade. When the RCT amalgamated to form the Royal Logistic Corps in 1993 the rank finally disappeared from the British Army.

See also 
Corps of Royal Artillery Drivers

Military ranks of the British Army
Military ranks of Australia
Military ranks of Canada